Volnay is the name of two communes in France:

 Volnay, Côte-d'Or
 Volnay, Sarthe

It may also refer to:
 Volnay AOC, a wine classification based on the town of the same name in Côte-d'Or